The 2011–12 season was FK Vojvodina's 6th season in Serbian SuperLiga. This article shows player statistics and all matches (official and friendly) that the club played during the 2011–12 season.

Players

Squad information

Squad statistics

Matches

Serbian SuperLiga

Serbian Cup

UEFA Europa League

External links
 Official website

FK Vojvodina seasons
Vojvodina
Vojvodina